Stefan Dassler (born 25 October 1962) is a German non-fiction author and docent for business studies.

Dassler was born and grew up in Bamberg and graduated at Dientzenhofer-Gymnasium in Bamberg in 1982. After his military service he studied Economics at the Otto-Friedrich-Universität Bamberg, then moved to Ludwig Maximilian University of Munich in 1984, where he studied business education with a focus on organizational psychology. He completed his studies in 1991 as Diplom-Handelslehrer (graduate business teacher). From 1991 to 1993 he studied philosophy.

From 1993 to 1995 he worked in a financial planning company in Bamberg, 1995–1996 in the Graf-Stauffenberg-secondary school. Since 1996 he has been working as a teacher in various private schools in Bamberg.

After a first book published in 1996 Dassler has been working regularly since 2003 as a writer of non-fiction books and magazine articles dealing with issues such as business, education and information technology.

Works 

 Sozialkompetenz-Training in der betrieblichen Ausbildung, GRIN Verlag, München 1996, 
 Onlinenachhilfe – Nachhilfeunterricht via Internet, Wissenschaftlicher Verlag Berlin 2004, 
 Schülernachhilfe. Ein Leitfaden für Lehrer und Studenten, Wissenschaftlicher Verlag Berlin 2005, 
 Erfolgreiche Existenzgründung – mit besonderer Berücksichtigung der Ich AG, Mole Verlag, Hamburg 2005, 
 Berufswahl und Ausbildungsstellensuche, Wissenschaftlicher Verlag Berlin, 2005, 
 Faszination Computer für Senioren, Wissenschaftlicher Verlag Berlin 2006, 
 Nachhaltigkeit als Bestandteil der Berufsausbildung, Wissenschaftlicher Verlag Berlin 2006, 
 Datenschutz in der modernen Informationsgesellschaft, Wissenschaftlicher Verlag Berlin 2007, 
 Bildungsfragen heute. Lernförderung, Berufsausbildung, Fortbildung, Wissenschaftlicher Verlag Berlin 2007, 
 Existenzgründung konkret. Ratgeber für angehende Unternehmer, CT Salzwasser-Verlag, Bremen 2009, 
 Schlüsselqualifikationen für Auszubildende. Übungen und Trainingsbeispiele, Igel Verlag, Hamburg 2009, 
 Sozialkunde FOS/BOS. Band 3: Gesellschaftliche Strukturen und Prozesse als Grundlage der Politik, Bildungsverlag EINS, Troisdorf 2009,

External links 
 Homepage Stefan Dassler (German)

Sources 

German non-fiction writers
German schoolteachers
People from Bamberg
1962 births
Living people
German male non-fiction writers